Lieutenant General Richard Kerens Sutherland (27 November 1893 – 25 June 1966) was a United States Army officer during World War II. He served as General of the Army Douglas MacArthur's Chief of Staff in the South West Pacific Area during the war.

Early life and education
Sutherland was born in Hancock, Maryland, on 27 November 1893, the only son among the six children of Howard Sutherland, who later became a US Senator from West Virginia, and Effie Harris Sutherland. Sutherland was raised and spent his adolescence and early adulthood in Elkins, West Virginia.

Sutherland was educated at Davis and Elkins College, Phillips Academy, from which he graduated in 1911, and Yale University, graduating with a Bachelor of Arts in 1916.

While at Yale, Sutherland joined ROTC. In July 1916, he enlisted as a private in the Connecticut National Guard.

Career

First World War
Later that year, the National Guard was federalized and Sutherland served on the Mexican border during the Pancho Villa Expedition. The future general soon accepted a National Guard commission as a second lieutenant in the field artillery in August 1916. In December 1916, he transferred to the Regular Army with a commission as a first lieutenant in the Infantry branch. Sutherland was promoted to captain in 1917.

He served with the 2nd Division on the Western Front during World War I. Sutherland was a student at a tank school in England.

Between the wars

Returning to the United States, Sutherland married Josephine Whiteside in 1920. They had one child, a daughter named Natalie.

Sutherland was an instructor at the United States Army Infantry School from 1920 to 1923 and professor of military science and tactics at the Shattuck School from 1923 to 1928. He graduated from the Command and General Staff College in 1928. Fluent in French, Sutherland attended the École supérieure de guerre in 1930. During 1932 and 1933, he attended the U.S. Army War College. He then served with the Operations and Training Division of the War Department General Staff.

In 1937, Sutherland went to Tientsin, China, in command of a battalion of the 15th Infantry; however, he was not promoted to major until March 1938, when he was assigned to the Office of the Military Advisor to the Commonwealth Government (Philippines), Manila, under General Douglas MacArthur with the "local rank" of lieutenant colonel. Sutherland was promoted to the rank in July of that year. Sutherland soon eased his superior, Lieutenant Colonel Dwight D. Eisenhower out of his position and became MacArthur's chief of staff.

World War II

As tensions with Japan rose, Sutherland was promoted to full colonel, then to brigadier general in July 1941 and major general in December 1941.

Following the fall of Manila, MacArthur's headquarters moved to the island fortress of Corregidor, where it was the target of numerous Japanese air raids, forcing the headquarters to move into the Malinta Tunnel. Sutherland was a frequent visitor to the front on Bataan. He was given a cash payment of $75,000 by President Quezon. In March 1942, MacArthur was ordered by President Franklin D. Roosevelt to relocate to Australia. Sutherland selected the group of advisers and subordinate military commanders that would accompany MacArthur and escape from the Philippines in four PT boats. Sutherland would remain MacArthur's chief of staff for the entire war.

Sutherland attracted antagonism from subordinate American and Australian officers because of perceptions that he was high-handed and overprotective of MacArthur. Sutherland was often given the role of "hatchet man". Bad news invariably came through Sutherland rather than from MacArthur himself.

According to some sources he contributed to a rift between MacArthur and the first SWPA air forces commander, Lieutenant General George Brett. Major General George Kenney, Brett's successor, became so frustrated with Sutherland in one meeting, that Kenney drew a dot on a plain page of paper and said: "the dot represents what you know about air operations, the entire rest of the paper what I know."

Sutherland had been taught to fly in 1940 by US Army Air Corps instructors at the Philippine Army Training Center and had been awarded a civil pilot's license by the Civil Aeronautics Association. Flying then became one of his favourite recreational activities. Throughout the war, he flew often as a co-pilot with General MacArthur's personal pilot, Weldon "Dusty" Rhoades. In March 1943 he asked to be formally recognised as a "service pilot", a form of pilot restricted to non-combat duties. His request was turned down by the Commanding General of the U.S. Army Air Forces, General Henry H. Arnold on the grounds that he was over the age limit and not performing flying duties. However, Sutherland secured an official pilot's rating under Philippine Army regulations in 1945.

In 1943 Sutherland and Kenney took part in an effort to promote General MacArthur's candidacy for the Presidency, working with Senator Arthur H. Vandenberg of Michigan to get the War Department to rescind the order that prevented MacArthur from seeking or accepting political office.

It was Sutherland who represented MacArthur before the Joint Chiefs of Staff on this and other occasions. Sutherland opened, read, and frequently answered all communications with MacArthur, including those addressed to him personally or "eyes only". Some decisions often attributed to MacArthur were actually taken by Sutherland. For example, the decision to bypass Mindanao and move on directly to Leyte was taken by Sutherland on MacArthur's behalf, while MacArthur was traveling under radio silence.

Sutherland's conduct in Washington enraged Army Chief of Staff General Marshall. He prepared a letter that he never sent to MacArthur saying Sutherland was "totally lacking in the facility of dealing with others.... He antagonized almost every official in the War Department with whom he came in contact and made our dealings with the Navy exceptionally difficult. Unfortunately he appears utterly unaware of the effects of his methods, but to put it bluntly, his attitude in almost every case seems to have been that he knew it all and nobody else knew much of anything."

When MacArthur discovered that Eisenhower had promoted his chief of staff, Walter Bedell Smith, to the rank of lieutenant general in January 1944, he immediately arranged for Sutherland to be promoted to the same rank.

Affair with Elaine Clark
During the time while MacArthur's GHQ SWPA was located in Melbourne, Sutherland met Elaine Bessemer Clark, the socialite daughter of Norman Brookes. Her husband, a British Army officer, was serving overseas. When GHQ moved to Brisbane in July 1942, Clark moved with it, as did two other civilian women, Beryl Stevenson and Louise Mowat, who worked as secretaries for Generals Kenney and Richard Marshall respectively. Sutherland installed Clark as the receptionist at the AMP Building, where MacArthur had his headquarters.

When GHQ began planning to move forward to New Guinea, Sutherland requested personnel from the Women's Army Corps to replace civilian employees of GHQ who, by agreement between MacArthur and the Prime Minister of Australia, John Curtin, could not be sent outside Australia. Sutherland further asked for direct commissions for Clark, Mowat and Stevenson. This exploited a loophole whereby enlistments in the Women's Army Corps were restricted to American citizens, but officer commissions were not. Major General Miller G. White, the U. S. Army Deputy Chief of Staff for Personnel, and Colonel Oveta Culp Hobby, the commanding officer of the Women's Army Corps, were strongly opposed; but they were overruled by Deputy Chief of Staff Joseph T. McNarney, on his being informed that the commissions were personally desired by MacArthur as essential to the operation of his headquarters and the prosecution of the war. Clark was commissioned as a captain, while the other two women, as well as General Eisenhower's driver, Kay Summersby, were commissioned as first lieutenants.

Although her rank was more a reflection of Sutherland's status rather than her own, Clark became an assistant to the headquarters commandant, with duties commensurate with her rank, and moved with Advance GHQ to Hollandia. However, her presence there, in contravention of MacArthur's agreement with Curtin, brought down the displeasure of MacArthur, who ordered her to be returned to Australia, first from Hollandia, and later from the Philippines. That Sutherland defied MacArthur on this matter caused a rift between the two.

Japanese surrender

At the Japanese surrender in Tokyo Bay on 2 September 1945, the Canadian representative, Colonel L. Moore Cosgrave, signed the Japanese Instrument of Surrender underneath, instead of on, the line for Canada. The Japanese drew attention to the error. Sutherland ran two strokes of his pen through the names of the four countries above the misplaced signatures and wrote them in where they belonged. The Japanese then accepted the corrected document.

Later life and death
Sutherland retired from the U.S. Army shortly after the Japanese surrender.

Returning home, he confessed his affair to Josephine and was ultimately reconciled with her. Letters from Clark were intercepted and destroyed by Natalie.

After the death of Josephine on 30 December 1957, he married Virginia Shaw Root in 1962.

Sutherland died at Walter Reed Army Medical Center on 25 June 1966. His funeral was held at the Fort Myer, Virginia chapel on 29 June 1966 and he is buried at Arlington National Cemetery along with other family members.

Decorations and medals

Dates of rank

References

External links
Generals of World War II

1893 births
1966 deaths
United States Army Field Artillery Branch personnel
United States Army Infantry Branch personnel
Burials at Arlington National Cemetery
Davis & Elkins College alumni
Military personnel from Maryland
Military personnel from West Virginia
People from Elkins, West Virginia
People from Hancock, Maryland
Phillips Academy alumni
Recipients of the Distinguished Service Cross (United States)
Recipients of the Distinguished Service Medal (US Army)
Recipients of the Distinguished Service Star
Recipients of the Silver Star
United States Army Command and General Staff College alumni
United States Army generals of World War II
United States Army generals
United States Army personnel of World War I
Yale University alumni